Gymnopilus melleus is a species of mushroom-forming fungus in the family Hymenogastraceae.

Description

Habitat and distribution
Gymnopilus melleus has been found growing in clusters on pine stumps in Alabama, fruiting in December.

See also

List of Gymnopilus species

References

melleus
Fungi of North America
Fungi described in 1969
Taxa named by Lexemuel Ray Hesler